This is a list of the mammal species recorded in China. There are 495 mammal species in China, of which thirteen are critically endangered, twenty-four are endangered, forty-seven are vulnerable, and seven are near threatened. One of the species listed for China can no longer be found in the wild.

The following tags are used to highlight each species' conservation status as assessed by the International Union for Conservation of Nature:

Some species were assessed using an earlier set of criteria. Species assessed using this system have the following instead of near threatened and least concern categories:

Order: Sirenia (manatees and dugongs) 

Sirenia is an order of fully aquatic, herbivorous mammals that inhabit rivers, estuaries, coastal marine waters, swamps, and marine wetlands. All four species are endangered.
Family: Dugongidae
Genus: Dugong
Dugong, D. dugon

Order: Proboscidea (elephants) 

The elephants comprise three living species and are the largest living land animals.
Family: Elephantidae (elephants)
Genus: Elephas
Asian elephant, E. maximus 
 Indian elephant, E. m. indicus

Order: Scandentia (treeshrews) 
The treeshrews are small mammals native to the tropical forests of Southeast Asia. Although called treeshrews, they are not true shrews and are not all arboreal.
Family: Tupaiidae (tree shrews)
Genus: Tupaia
Northern treeshrew, T. belangeri

Order: Primates 

The order Primates contains humans and their closest relatives: lemurs, lorisoids, monkeys, and apes.
Suborder: Strepsirrhini
Infraorder: Lemuriformes
Superfamily: Lorisoidea
Family: Lorisidae (lorises, bushbabies)
Genus: Nycticebus
Bengal slow loris, N. bengalensis 
Genus Xanthonycticebus
Pygmy slow loris, X. pygmaeus 
Suborder: Haplorhini
Infraorder: Simiiformes
Parvorder: Catarrhini
Superfamily: Cercopithecoidea
Family: Cercopithecidae (Old World monkeys)
Genus: Macaca
Stump-tailed macaque, M. arctoides 
Assam macaque, M. assamensis 
 Northern pig-tailed macaque, M. leonina 
 White-cheeked macaque, M. leucogenys 
Rhesus macaque, M. mulatta 
 Tibetan macaque, M. thibetana 
Subfamily: Colobinae
Genus: Semnopithecus
Nepal gray langur, S. schistaceus 
Genus: Trachypithecus
 Indochinese grey langur, T. crepusculus 
Francois' langur, T. francoisi 
Shan State langur, T. melamera 
 Bonneted langur, T. pileatus 
 White-headed langur, T. leucocephalus 
Genus: Rhinopithecus
 Black snub-nosed monkey, R. bieti 
 Gray snub-nosed monkey, R. brelichi 
 Golden snub-nosed monkey, R. roxellana 
Superfamily: Hominoidea
Family: Hylobatidae (gibbons)
Genus: Hoolock
Western hoolock gibbon, H. hoolock  presence uncertain
Eastern hoolock gibbon, H. leuconedys 
Skywalker hoolock gibbon, H. tianxing 
Genus: Hylobates
Lar gibbon, H. lar 
Genus: Nomascus
 Black crested gibbon, N. concolor 
 Hainan black crested gibbon, N. hainanus 
 White-cheeked crested gibbon, N. leucogenys 
 Eastern black crested gibbon, N. nasutus

Order: Rodentia (rodents) 

Rodents make up the largest order of mammals, with over 40% of mammalian species. They have two incisors in the upper and lower jaw which grow continually and must be kept short by gnawing.
Suborder: Hystricognathi
Family: Hystricidae (Old World porcupines)
Genus: Atherurus
 Asiatic brush-tailed porcupine, A. macrourus 
Genus: Hystrix
Malayan porcupine, H. brachyura 
Indian crested porcupine, H. indica 
Suborder: Sciurognathi
Family: Castoridae (beavers)
Genus: Castor
Eurasian beaver, C. fiber 
Family: Sciuridae (squirrels)
Subfamily: Ratufinae
Genus: Ratufa
 Black giant squirrel, Ratufa bicolor
Subfamily: Sciurinae
Tribe: Sciurini
Genus: Sciurus
Red squirrel, S. vulgaris 
Tribe: Pteromyini
Genus: Aeretes
 Groove-toothed flying squirrel, Aeretes melanopterus
Genus: Belomys
 Hairy-footed flying squirrel, Belomys pearsonii
Genus: Hylopetes
 Particolored flying squirrel, Hylopetes alboniger EN
 Indochinese flying squirrel, Hylopetes phayrei
Genus: Petaurista
 Red and white giant flying squirrel, Petaurista alborufus
 Spotted giant flying squirrel, Petaurista elegans
 Japanese giant flying squirrel, Petaurista leucogenys
 Bhutan giant flying squirrel, Petaurista nobilis
 Red giant flying squirrel, Petaurista petaurista
 Indian giant flying squirrel, Petaurista philippensis
 Chinese giant flying squirrel, Petaurista xanthotis
Genus: Pteromys
 Siberian flying squirrel, Pteromys volans
Genus: Trogopterus
 Complex-toothed flying squirrel, Trogopterus xanthipes EN
Subfamily: Callosciurinae
Genus: Callosciurus
 Pallas's squirrel, Callosciurus erythraeus
 Inornate squirrel, Callosciurus inornatus
 Phayre's squirrel, Callosciurus phayrei
 Irrawaddy squirrel, Callosciurus pygerythrus VU
 Anderson's squirrel, Callosciurus quinquestriatus VU
Genus: Dremomys
 Orange-bellied Himalayan squirrel, Dremomys lokriah
 Perny's long-nosed squirrel, Dremomys pernyi
 Red-hipped squirrel, Dremomys pyrrhomerus
 Asian red-cheeked squirrel, Dremomys rufigenis
Genus: Tamiops
 Himalayan striped squirrel, Tamiops macclellandi
 Maritime striped squirrel, Tamiops maritimus
 Swinhoe's striped squirrel, Tamiops swinhoei
Subfamily: Xerinae
Tribe: Marmotini
Genus: Marmota
 Gray marmot, Marmota baibacina
 Long-tailed marmot, Marmota caudata
 Himalayan marmot, Marmota himalayana
 Tarbagan marmot, Marmota sibirica
Genus: Sciurotamias
 Père David's rock squirrel, Sciurotamias davidianus
 Forrest's rock squirrel, Sciurotamias forresti VU
Genus: Spermophilus
 Alashan ground squirrel, Spermophilus alashanicus
 Daurian ground squirrel, Spermophilus dauricus
 Red-cheeked ground squirrel, Spermophilus erythrogenys
 Yellow ground squirrel, Spermophilus fulvus
 Long-tailed ground squirrel, Spermophilus undulatus
Genus: Tamias
 Siberian chipmunk, Tamias sibiricus
Family: Gliridae (dormice)
Subfamily: Leithiinae
Genus: Dryomys
 Forest dormouse, Dryomys nitedula
Genus: Chaetocauda
 Chinese dormouse, Chaetocauda sichuanensis EN
Family: Dipodidae (jerboas)
Subfamily: Allactaginae
Genus: Allactaga
 Balikun jerboa, Allactaga balikunica
 Gobi jerboa, Allactaga bullata
 Small five-toed jerboa, Allactaga elater
 Mongolian five-toed jerboa, Allactaga sibirica
Genus: Pygeretmus
 Dwarf fat-tailed jerboa, Pygeretmus pumilio
Subfamily: Cardiocraniinae
Genus: Cardiocranius
 Five-toed pygmy jerboa, Cardiocranius paradoxus VU
Genus: Salpingotus
 Thick-tailed pygmy jerboa, Salpingotus crassicauda VU
 Kozlov's pygmy jerboa, Salpingotus kozlovi
Subfamily: Dipodinae
Genus: Dipus
 Northern three-toed jerboa, Dipus sagitta
Genus: Stylodipus
 Andrews's three-toed jerboa, Stylodipus andrewsi
 Mongolian three-toed jerboa, Stylodipus sungorus
 Thick-tailed three-toed jerboa, Stylodipus telum
Subfamily: Euchoreutinae
Genus: Euchoreutes
 Long-eared jerboa, Euchoreutes naso EN
Subfamily: Sicistinae
Genus: Sicista
 Long-tailed birch mouse, Sicista caudata EN
 Chinese birch mouse, Sicista concolor
 Southern birch mouse, Sicista subtilis
 Tien Shan birch mouse, Sicista tianshanica
Subfamily: Zapodinae
Genus: Eozapus
 Chinese jumping mouse, Eozapus setchuanus VU
Family: Platacanthomyidae
Genus: Typhlomys
 Chinese pygmy dormouse, Typhlomys cinereus
Family: Spalacidae
Subfamily: Myospalacinae
Genus: Eospalax
 Chinese zokor, Eospalax fontanierii VU
 Rothschild's zokor, Eospalax rothschildi
 Smith's zokor, Eospalax smithii
Genus: Myospalax
 False zokor, Myospalax aspalax
 Transbaikal zokor, Myospalax psilurus
Subfamily: Rhizomyinae
Genus: Cannomys
 Lesser bamboo rat, Cannomys badius
Genus: Rhizomys
 Hoary bamboo rat, Rhizomys pruinosus
 Chinese bamboo rat, Rhizomys sinensis
 Large bamboo rat, Rhizomys sumatrensis
Family: Cricetidae
Subfamily: Cricetinae
Genus: Allocricetulus
 Mongolian hamster, Allocricetulus curtatus
Genus: Cansumys
 Gansu hamster, Cansumys canus
Genus: Cricetulus
 Tibetan dwarf hamster, Cricetulus alticola
 Chinese striped hamster, Cricetulus barabensis
 Kam dwarf hamster, Cricetulus kamensis
 Long-tailed dwarf hamster, Cricetulus longicaudatus
 Grey dwarf hamster, Cricetulus migratorius
 Sokolov's dwarf hamster, Cricetulus sokolovi
Genus: Cricetus
 European hamster, C. cricetus  presence uncertain
Genus: Phodopus
 Campbell's dwarf hamster, Phodopus campbelli
 Djungarian hamster, Phodopus sungorus
 Roborovski hamster, Phodopus roborovskii
Genus: Tscherskia
 Greater long-tailed hamster, Tscherskia triton
Subfamily: Arvicolinae
Genus: Alticola
 Silver mountain vole, Alticola argentatus
 Gobi Altai mountain vole, Alticola barakshin
 Royle's mountain vole, Alticola roylei
 Stolička's mountain vole, Alticola stoliczkanus
 Strachey's mountain vole, Alticola stracheyi
 Flat-headed vole, Alticola strelzowi
Genus: Arvicola
 Water vole, Arvicola terrestris
Genus: Clethrionomys
 Tien Shan red-backed vole, Clethrionomys centralis
 Bank vole, Clethrionomys glareolus
 Grey red-backed vole, Clethrionomys rufocanus
 Northern red-backed vole, Clethrionomys rutilus
Genus: Ellobius
 Zaisan mole vole, Ellobius tancrei
Genus: Eolagurus
 Yellow steppe lemming, Eolagurus luteus
 Przewalski's steppe lemming, Eolagurus przewalskii
Genus: Eothenomys
 Pratt's vole, Eothenomys chinensis
 Southwest China vole, Eothenomys custos
 Ganzu vole, Eothenomys eva
 Kolan vole, Eothenomys inez
 Père David's vole, Eothenomys melanogaster
 Chaotung vole, Eothenomys olitor
 Yulungshan vole, Eothenomys proditor
 Shansei vole, Eothenomys shanseius
Genus: Lagurus
 Steppe lemming, Lagurus lagurus
Genus: Lasiopodomys
 Brandt's vole, Lasiopodomys brandtii
 Plateau vole, Lasiopodomys fuscus
 Mandarin vole, Lasiopodomys mandarinus
Genus: Microtus
 Field vole, Microtus agrestis
 Reed vole, Microtus fortis
 Narrow-headed vole, Microtus gregalis
 Chinese scrub vole, Microtus irene
 Juniper vole, Microtus juldaschi
 Blyth's vole, Microtus leucurus
 Lacustrine vole, Microtus limnophilus
 Maximowicz's vole, Microtus maximowiczii
 Mongolian vole, Microtus mongolicus
 Common vole, Microtus arvalis
 Sikkim vole, Microtus sikimensis
 Social vole, Microtus socialis
Genus: Myopus
 Wood lemming, Myopus schisticolor
Genus: Proedromys
 Duke of Bedford's vole, Proedromys bedfordi
Genus: Volemys
 Clarke's vole, Volemys clarkei
 Szechuan vole, Volemys millicens
 Marie's vole, Volemys musseri
Family: Muridae (mice, rats, voles, gerbils, hamsters)
Subfamily: Gerbillinae
Genus: Brachiones
 Przewalski's gerbil, Brachiones przewalskii
Genus: Meriones
 Cheng's jird, Meriones chengi CR
 Libyan jird, Meriones libycus LC
 Midday jird, Meriones meridianus
 Tamarisk jird, Meriones tamariscinus
 Mongolian gerbil, Meriones unguiculatus
Genus: Rhombomys
 Great gerbil, Rhombomys opimus
Subfamily: Murinae
Genus: Apodemus
 Striped field mouse, Apodemus agrarius
 Chevrier's field mouse, Apodemus chevrieri
 South China field mouse, Apodemus draco
 Sichuan field mouse, Apodemus latronum
 Korean field mouse, Apodemus peninsulae
 Ural field mouse, Apodemus uralensis
Genus: Bandicota
 Greater bandicoot rat, Bandicota indica
Genus: Berylmys
 Bower's white-toothed rat, Berylmys bowersi
 Kenneth's white-toothed rat, Berylmys mackenziei
Genus: Chiropodomys
 Pencil-tailed tree mouse, Chiropodomys gliroides
Genus: Dacnomys
 Millard's rat, Dacnomys millardi
Genus: Hadromys
 Manipur bush rat, Hadromys humei
Genus: Hapalomys
 Delacour's marmoset rat, Hapalomys delacouri
Genus: Leopoldamys
 Edwards's long-tailed giant rat, Leopoldamys edwardsi
Genus: Micromys
 Harvest mouse, Micromys minutus
Genus: Mus
 Ryukyu mouse, Mus caroli
 Cook's mouse, Mus cookii
 Gairdner's shrewmouse, Mus pahari
Genus: Nesokia
 Short-tailed bandicoot rat, Nesokia indica LC
Genus: Niviventer
 Anderson's white-bellied rat, Niviventer andersoni
 Chinese white-bellied rat, Niviventer confucianus
 Smoke-bellied rat, Niviventer eha
 Large white-bellied rat, Niviventer excelsior
 Chestnut white-bellied rat, Niviventer fulvescens
Genus: Rattus
 Lesser ricefield rat, Rattus losea
 Himalayan field rat, Rattus nitidus
 Brown rat, Rattus norvegicus
 Sikkim rat, Rattus sikkimensis VU
 Tanezumi rat, Rattus tanezumi
 Turkestan rat, Rattus turkestanicus
Genus: Vandeleuria
 Asiatic long-tailed climbing mouse, Vandeleuria oleracea
Genus: Vernaya
 Red climbing mouse, Vernaya fulva VU

Order: Lagomorpha (lagomorphs) 

The lagomorphs comprise two families, Leporidae (hares and rabbits), and Ochotonidae (pikas). Though they can resemble rodents, and were classified as a superfamily in that order until the early 20th century, they have since been considered a separate order. They differ from rodents in a number of physical characteristics, such as having four incisors in the upper jaw rather than two.
Family: Ochotonidae (pikas)
Genus: Ochotona
 Alpine pika, Ochotona alpina
 Helan Shan pika, Ochotona argentata CR
 Gansu pika, Ochotona cansus
 Black-lipped pika, Ochotona curzoniae
 Daurian pika, Ochotona dauurica
 Chinese red pika, Ochotona erythrotis
 Forrest's pika, Ochotona forresti
 Gaoligong pika, Ochotona gaoligongensis DD
 Glover's pika, Ochotona gloveri
 Himalayan pika, Ochotona himalayana
 Ochotona huanglongensis
 Northern pika, Ochotona hyperborea
 Ili pika, Ochotona iliensis VU
 Koslov's pika, Ochotona koslowi EN
 Ladak pika, Ochotona ladacensis
 Large-eared pika, Ochotona macrotis
 Muli pika, Ochotona muliensis DD
 Nubra pika, Ochotona nubrica
 Pallas's pika, Ochotona pallasi
 Royle's pika, Ochotona roylei
 Turkestan red pika, Ochotona rutila
 Moupin pika, Ochotona thibetana
 Thomas's pika, Ochotona thomasi
Family: Leporidae (rabbits, hares)
Genus: Lepus
 Yunnan hare, L. comus
 Korean hare, L. coreanus
 Hainan hare, L. hainanus 
 Manchurian hare, L. mandshuricus 
Woolly hare, L. oiostolus 
 Chinese hare, L. sinensis
 Desert hare, L. tibetanus 
Mountain hare, L. timidus 
Tolai hare, L. tolai 
 Yarkand hare, L. yarkandensis

Order: Eulipotyphla (hedgehogs, gymnures, shrews, moles, and solenodons) 

Eulipotyphla comprises the hedgehogs and gymnures (family Erinaceidae, formerly also the order Erinaceomorpha), solenodons (family Solenodontidae), the desmans, moles, and shrew-like moles (family Talpidae) and true shrews (family Soricidae).

Family: Erinaceidae (hedgehogs)
Subfamily: Erinaceinae
Genus: Erinaceus
 Amur hedgehog, Erinaceus amurensis LR/lc
Genus: Hemiechinus
 Long-eared hedgehog, Hemiechinus auritus LR/lc
Genus: Mesechinus
 Daurian hedgehog, Mesechinus dauuricus LR/lc
 Hugh's hedgehog, Mesechinus hughi VU
Subfamily: Galericinae
Genus: Hylomys
 Hainan gymnure, Hylomys hainanensis EN
 Shrew gymnure, Hylomys sinensis LR/nt
 Short-tailed gymnure, Hylomys suillus LR/lc
Family: Soricidae (shrews)
Subfamily: Crocidurinae
Genus: Crocidura
 Asian gray shrew, Crocidura attenuata
 Southeast Asian shrew, Crocidura fuliginosa
 Gmelin's white-toothed shrew, Crocidura gmelini
 Gueldenstaedt's shrew, Crocidura gueldenstaedtii
 Horsfield's shrew, Crocidura horsfieldii
 Ussuri white-toothed shrew, Crocidura lasiura
 Taiga shrew, Crocidura pullata
 Asian lesser white-toothed shrew, Crocidura shantungensis DD
 Siberian shrew, Crocidura sibirica
 Lesser white-toothed shrew, Crocidura suaveolens
Genus: Suncus
 Etruscan shrew, Suncus etruscus LC
Asian house shrew, S. murinus 
Subfamily: Soricinae
Tribe: Anourosoricini
Genus: Anourosorex
 Chinese mole shrew, Anourosorex squamipes LR/lc
Tribe: Blarinellini
Genus: Blarinella
 Northern short-tailed shrew, Blarinella quadraticauda LR/lc
 Southern short-tailed shrew, Blarinella wardi LR/nt
Tribe: Nectogalini
Genus: Chimarrogale
 Himalayan water shrew, Chimarrogale himalayica LR/lc
 Chinese water shrew, Chimarrogale styani LR/lc
Genus: Nectogale
 Elegant water shrew, Nectogale elegans LR/lc
Genus: Neomys
 Eurasian water shrew, Neomys fodiens LR/lc
Genus: Episoriculus
 Hodgsons's brown-toothed shrew, Episoriculus caudatus LR/lc
 Long-tailed brown-toothed shrew, Episoriculus leucops LR/lc
 Long-tailed mountain shrew, Episoriculus macrurus LR/lc
Genus: Chodsigoa
 De Winton's shrew, Chodsigoa hypsibius LR/lc
 Lamulate shrew, Chodsigoa lamula LR/lc
 Lowe's shrew, Chodsigoa parca LR/lc
 Salenski's shrew, Chodsigoa salenskii CR
 Smith's shrew, Chodsigoa smithii LR/lc
Genus: Soriculus
 Himalayan shrew, Soriculus nigrescens LR/lc
Tribe: Soricini
Genus: Sorex
 Tien Shan shrew, Sorex asper LR/lc
 Lesser striped shrew, Sorex bedfordiae LR/lc
 Laxmann's shrew, Sorex caecutiens LR/lc
 Gansu shrew, Sorex cansulus CR
 Greater stripe-backed shrew, Sorex cylindricauda EN
 Siberian large-toothed shrew, Sorex daphaenodon LR/lc
 Chinese highland shrew, Sorex excelsus DD
 Slender shrew, Sorex gracillimus LR/lc
 Taiga shrew, Sorex isodon LR/lc
 Kozlov's shrew, Sorex kozlovi CR
 Eurasian least shrew, Sorex minutissimus LR/lc
 Eurasian pygmy shrew, Sorex minutus LR/lc
 Ussuri shrew, Sorex mirabilis LR/lc
 Chinese shrew, Sorex sinalis VU
 Tibetan shrew, Sorex thibetanus LR/lc
 Tundra shrew, Sorex tundrensis LR/lc
Family: Talpidae (moles)
Subfamily: Scalopinae
Tribe: Scalopini
Genus: Scapanulus
 Gansu mole, Scapanulus oweni LR/lc
Subfamily: Talpinae
Tribe: Scaptonychini
Genus: Scaptonyx
 Long-tailed mole, Scaptonyx fusicaudus LR/lc
Tribe: Talpini
Genus: Euroscaptor
 Greater Chinese mole, Euroscaptor grandis LR/lc
 Long-nosed mole, Euroscaptor longirostris LR/lc
 Himalayan mole, Euroscaptor micrura LR/lc
Genus: Mogera
 Insular mole, Mogera insularis LR/lc
 Large mole, Mogera robusta LR/lc
Genus: Parascaptor
 White-tailed mole, Parascaptor leucura LR/lc
Genus: Scaptochirus
 Short-faced mole, Scaptochirus moschatus LR/lc
Subfamily: Uropsilinae
Genus: Uropsilus
 Anderson's shrew mole, Uropsilus andersoni LR/lc
 Gracile shrew mole, Uropsilus gracilis LR/lc
 Inquisitive shrew mole, Uropsilus investigator EN
 Chinese shrew mole, Uropsilus soricipes EN

Order: Chiroptera (bats) 

The bats' most distinguishing feature is that their forelimbs are developed as wings, making them the only mammals capable of flight. Bat species account for about 20% of all mammals.
Family: Pteropodidae (flying foxes, Old World fruit bats)
Subfamily: Pteropodinae
Genus: Cynopterus
Lesser short-nosed fruit bat, C. brachyotis 
 Greater short-nosed fruit bat, Cynopterus sphinx
Genus: Pteropus
Indian flying fox, P. giganteus 
Lyle's flying fox, P. lylei 
Large flying fox, P. vampyrus 
Genus: Rousettus
 Leschenault's rousette, Rousettus leschenaulti
Genus: Sphaerias
 Blanford's fruit bat, Sphaerias blanfordi
Subfamily: Macroglossinae
Genus: Eonycteris
 Lesser dawn bat, Eonycteris spelaea
Family: Vespertilionidae
Subfamily: Kerivoulinae
Genus: Kerivoula
 Hardwicke's woolly bat, Kerivoula hardwickii
 Painted bat, Kerivoula picta
Subfamily: Myotinae
Genus: Myotis
 Szechwan myotis, Myotis altarium
Lesser mouse-eared bat, M. blythii 
 Far Eastern myotis, Myotis bombinus
 Large myotis, Myotis chinensis
Pond bat, M. dasycneme 
Daubenton's bat, M. daubentonii  
 Fringed long-footed myotis, Myotis fimbriatus
Hodgson's bat, M. formosus 
 Fraternal myotis, Myotis frater
 Horsfield's bat, Myotis horsfieldii
 Ikonnikov's bat, Myotis ikonnikovi
 Burmese whiskered bat, Myotis montivagus
Whiskered bat, M. mystacinus 
Natterer's bat, M. nattereri 
 Peking myotis, Myotis pequinius
 Large-footed bat, Myotis adversus
 Rickett's big-footed bat, Myotis ricketti
 Himalayan whiskered bat, Myotis siligorensis
Subfamily: Vespertilioninae
Genus: Arielulus
 Black-gilded pipistrelle, Arielulus circumdatus
Genus: Barbastella (barbastelles or barbastelle bats)
Western barbastelle, B. barbastellus 
Beijing barbastelle, Barbastella beijingensis
Asian barbastelle, Barbastella leucomelas
Genus: Eptesicus
 Gobi big brown bat, Eptesicus gobiensis
 Northern bat, Eptesicus nilssoni
 Thick-eared bat, Eptesicus pachyotis
 Serotine bat, Eptesicus serotinus
Genus: Falsistrellus
 Chocolate pipistrelle, Falsistrellus affinis
Genus: Hesperoptenus
 Tickell's bat, Hesperoptenus tickelli
Genus: Hypsugo
 Chinese pipistrelle, Hypsugo pulveratus
Savi's pipistrelle, H. savii 
Genus: Ia
Great evening bat, I. io 
Genus: Nyctalus
 Chinese noctule, Nyctalus plancyi
 Birdlike noctule, Nyctalus aviator
Lesser noctule, N. leisleri 
Common noctule, N. noctula 
Genus: Pipistrellus
 Kelaart's pipistrelle, Pipistrellus ceylonicus
 Mount Popa pipistrelle, Pipistrellus paterculus
 Common pipistrelle, Pipistrellus pipistrellus LC
 Least pipistrelle, Pipistrellus tenuis
Genus: Plecotus
 several species, sometimes erroneously reported as P. auritus and P. austriacus although these species are only found in Western Palaearctic
Genus: Scotomanes
 Harlequin bat, Scotomanes ornatus
Genus: Scotophilus
 Greater Asiatic yellow bat, Scotophilus heathi
Genus: Tylonycteris
 Lesser bamboo bat, Tylonycteris pachypus
 Greater bamboo bat, Tylonycteris robustula
Genus: Vespertilio
 Parti-coloured bat, Vespertilio murinus
 Asian parti-colored bat, Vespertilio superans
Subfamily: Murininae
Genus: Murina
 Little tube-nosed bat, Murina aurata
 Round-eared tube-nosed bat, Murina cyclotis
 Dusky tube-nosed bat, Murina fusca DD
 Hutton's tube-nosed bat, Murina huttoni
 Greater tube-nosed bat, Murina leucogaster
Subfamily: Miniopterinae
Genus: Miniopterus
 Western bent-winged bat, Miniopterus magnater
 Intermediate long-fingered bat, Miniopterus medius
Common bent-wing bat, M. schreibersii 
Family: Molossidae
Genus: Chaerephon
 Wrinkle-lipped free-tailed bat, Chaerephon plicata
Genus: Tadarida
 La Touche's free-tailed bat, Tadarida latouchei DD
 European free-tailed bat, Tadarida teniotis
Family: Emballonuridae
Genus: Taphozous
 Black-bearded tomb bat, Taphozous melanopogon
Family: Megadermatidae
Genus: Megaderma
 Greater false vampire bat, Megaderma lyra
Family: Rhinolophidae
Subfamily: Rhinolophinae
Genus: Rhinolophus
 Intermediate horseshoe bat, Rhinolophus affinis
 Little Japanese horseshoe bat, Rhinolophus cornutus
Greater horseshoe bat, R. ferrumequinum 
 Blyth's horseshoe bat, Rhinolophus lepidus
 Woolly horseshoe bat, Rhinolophus luctus
 Big-eared horseshoe bat, Rhinolophus macrotis
 Osgood's horseshoe bat, Rhinolophus osgoodi DD
 Pearson's horseshoe bat, Rhinolophus pearsoni
 Least horseshoe bat, Rhinolophus pusillus
 King horseshoe bat, Rhinolophus rex VU
 Rufous horseshoe bat, Rhinolophus rouxi
 Chinese rufous horseshoe bat, Rhinolophus sinicus
 Thomas's horseshoe bat, Rhinolophus thomasi
 Dobson's horseshoe bat, Rhinolophus yunanensis
Subfamily: Hipposiderinae
Genus: Aselliscus
 Stoliczka's trident bat, Aselliscus stoliczkanus
Genus: Coelops
 East Asian tailless leaf-nosed bat, Coelops frithii
Genus: Hipposideros
 Great roundleaf bat, Hipposideros armiger
 Intermediate roundleaf bat, Hipposideros larvatus
 Pomona roundleaf bat, Hipposideros pomona
 Pratt's roundleaf bat, Hipposideros pratti

Order: Pholidota (pangolins) 

The order Pholidota comprises the eight species of pangolin. Pangolins are anteaters and have the powerful claws, elongated snout and long tongue seen in the other unrelated anteater species.
Family: Manidae
Genus: Manis
Sunda pangolin, M. javanica 
Chinese pangolin, M. pentadactyla

Order: Cetacea (whales) 

The order Cetacea includes whales, dolphins and porpoises. They are the mammals most fully adapted to aquatic life with a spindle-shaped nearly hairless body, protected by a thick layer of blubber, and forelimbs and tail modified to provide propulsion underwater.
Suborder: Mysticeti
Family: Balaenidae
Genus: Eubalaena
 North Pacific right whale, Eubalaena japonica CR
Family: Eschrichtiidae
Genus: Eschrichtius
Western gray whale, Eschrichtius robustus CR
Family: Balaenopteridae
Subfamily: Megapterinae
Genus: Megaptera
 Northern humpback whale, Megaptera novaeangliae VU
Subfamily: Balaenopterinae
Genus: Balaenoptera
 Common minke whale, Balaenoptera acutorostrata acutorostrata
 Omura's whale, Balaenoptera omurai DD
 Bryde's whale, Balaenoptera brydei DD
 Eden's whale, Balaenoptera edeni DD
 Indo-Pacific Bryde's whale DD
 Northern sei whale, Balaenoptera borealis borealis EN
 Northern fin whale, Balaenoptera physalus physalus EN
 Northern blue whale, Balaenoptera musculus musculus EN
Suborder: Odontoceti
Superfamily: Platanistoidea
Family: Lipotidae
Genus: Lipotes
 Baiji, Lipotes vexillifer CR
Family: Phocoenidae
Genus: Neophocaena
 Finless porpoise, Neophocaena phocaenoides phocaenoides VU
 Yangtze River finless porpoise, Neophocaena phocaenoides asiaorientalis CR
 Sunameri, Neophocaena phocaenoides sunameri VU
Genus: Phocoena
 Harbour porpoise, Phocoena phocoena VU
Genus: Phocoenoides
 Dall's porpoise, Phocoenoides dalli
Family: Physeteridae
Genus: Physeter
 Sperm whale, Physeter macrocephalus VU
Family: Kogiidae
Genus: Kogia
 Pygmy sperm whale, Kogia breviceps
 Dwarf sperm whale, Kogia sima
Family: Ziphidae
Genus: Ziphius
 Cuvier's beaked whale, Ziphius cavirostris DD
Subfamily: Hyperoodontinae
Genus: Mesoplodon
 Blainville's beaked whale, Mesoplodon densirostris DD
 Ginkgo-toothed beaked whale, Mesoplodon ginkgodens DD
Family: Delphinidae (marine dolphins)
Genus: Steno
 Rough-toothed dolphin, Steno bredanensis DD
Genus: Sousa
 Chinese white dolphin, Sousa chinensis DD
Genus: Tursiops
 Common bottlenose dolphin, Tursiops truncatus DD
 Indo-Pacific bottlenose dolphin, Tursiops aduncus DD
Genus: Stenella
 Pantropical spotted dolphin, Stenella attenuata
 Striped dolphin, Stenella coeruleoalba
 Spinner dolphin, Stenella longirostris
Genus: Delphinus
 Long-beaked common dolphin, Delphinus capensis DD
Genus: Lagenodelphis
 Fraser's dolphin, Lagenodelphis hosei DD
Genus: Sagmatias
 Pacific white-sided dolphin, Sagmatias obliquidens
Genus: Grampus
 Risso's dolphin, Grampus griseus DD
Genus: Feresa
 Pygmy killer whale, Feresa attenuata DD
Genus: Peponocephala
 Melon-headed whale, Peponocephala electra
Genus: Pseudorca
 False killer whale, Pseudorca crassidens
Genus: Globicephala
 Short-finned pilot whale, Globicephala macrorhynchus
Genus: Orcinus
 Orca, Orcinus orca

Order: Carnivora (carnivorans) 

Carnivorans include over 260 species, the majority of which primarily eat meat. They have a characteristic skull shape and dentition.
Suborder: Feliformia
Family: Felidae (cats)
Subfamily: Felinae
Genus: Catopuma
Asian golden cat, C. temminckii 
Genus: Felis
Chinese mountain cat, F. bieti  
Jungle cat, F. chaus 
African wildcat, F. lybica  
 Asiatic wildcat, F. l. ornata 
Genus: Lynx
Eurasian lynx, L. lynx 
Turkestan lynx, L. l. isabellinus
Genus: Otocolobus
Pallas's cat, O. manul 
Genus: Pardofelis
Marbled cat, P. marmorata 
Genus: Prionailurus
Leopard cat, P. bengalensis 
Subfamily: Pantherinae
Genus: Neofelis
Clouded leopard, N. nebulosa 
Genus: Panthera
Leopard, P. pardus 
Indochinese leopard, P. p. delacouri 
Amur leopard, P. p. orientalis 
Tiger, P. tigris 
Siberian tiger, P. t. tigris 
South China tiger, P. t. tigris , possibly 
Snow leopard, P. uncia 
Family: Viverridae
Subfamily: Paradoxurinae
Genus: Arctictis
Binturong, A. binturong 
Genus: Arctogalidia
Small-toothed palm civet, A. trivirgata 
Genus: Paguma
Masked palm civet, P. larvata 
Genus: Paradoxurus
Asian palm civet, P. hermaphroditus  
Subfamily: Hemigalinae
Genus: Chrotogale
Owston's palm civet, Chrotogale owstoni 
Subfamily: Prionodontinae
Genus: Prionodon
Spotted linsang, P. pardicolor 
Subfamily: Viverrinae
Genus: Viverra
Large-spotted civet, V. megaspila 
Malayan civet, V. tangalunga 
Large Indian civet, V. zibetha 
Genus: Viverricula
Small Indian civet, V. indica 
Family: Herpestidae (mongooses)
Genus: Urva
Small Indian mongoose, U. auropunctata  presence uncertain
Javan mongoose, U. javanica  
Crab-eating mongoose, U. urva 
Suborder: Caniformia
Family: Ailuridae (red panda)
Genus: Ailurus
Himalayan red panda, A. fulgens 
Chinese red panda, A. styani 
Family: Canidae (dogs, foxes)
Genus: Canis
Gray wolf, C. lupus 
 Himalayan wolf, C. l. chanco
 Mongolian wolf, C. l. chanco 
Genus: Cuon
Dhole, C. alpinus 
 Ussuri dhole, C. a. alpinus 
 Tien Shan dhole, C. a. hesperius
Genus: Nyctereutes
Raccoon dog, N. procyonoides 
Genus: Vulpes
Corsac fox, V. corsac 
Tibetan fox, V. ferrilata 
Red fox, V. vulpes 
Family: Ursidae (bears)
Genus: Ailuropoda
Giant panda, A. melanoleuca 
Genus: Helarctos
Sun bear, H. malayanus  presence uncertain
Genus: Ursus
Brown bear, U. arctos 
 Eurasian brown bear, U. a. arctos 
 Himalayan brown bear, U. a. isabellinus 
 Ussuri brown bear, U. a. lasiotus 
 Tibetan blue bear, U. a. pruinosus 
 Asiatic black bear, U. thibetanus 
Himalayan black bear, U. t. laniger 
Indochinese black bear, U. t. mupinensis
Tibetan black bear, U. t. thibetanus
Ussuri black bear, U. t. ussuricus
Family: Mustelidae (mustelids)
Genus: Aonyx
Asian small-clawed otter, A. cinereus 
Genus: Arctonyx
Greater hog badger, A. collaris , presence uncertain
Northern hog badger, A. albogularis 
Genus: Gulo
Wolverine, G. gulo 
Genus: Lutra
European otter, L. lutra 
Genus: Lutrogale
Smooth-coated otter, L. perspicillata 
Genus: Martes
Yellow-throated marten, M. flavigula 
Beech marten, M. foina 
Sable, M. zibellina 
Genus: Meles
Asian badger, M. leucurus 
Genus: Melogale
Chinese ferret badger, M. moschata  
Genus: Mustela
Sichuan weasel, M. aistoodonnivalis 
Mountain weasel, M. altaica 
Stoat, M. erminea 
Steppe polecat, M. eversmannii 
Yellow-bellied weasel, M. kathiah 
Least weasel, M. nivalis 
Siberian weasel, M. sibirica 
Back-striped weasel, M. strigidorsa 
Genus: Vormela
Marbled polecat, V. peregusna 
Family: Otariidae (eared seals)
Genus: Callorhinus
Northern fur seal, C. ursinus  vagrant
Genus: Eumetopias
Steller sea lion, E. jubatus  vagrant
Family: Phocidae (earless seals)
Genus: Erignathus
 Bearded seal, E. barbatus 
Genus: Phoca
 Spotted seal, P. largha 
Genus: Pusa
 Ringed seal, P. hispida  vagrant

Order: Perissodactyla (odd-toed ungulates) 

The odd-toed ungulates are browsing and grazing mammals. They are usually large to very large, and have relatively simple stomachs and a large middle toe.

Family: Equidae (horses etc.)
Genus: Equus
 Wild horse, E. ferus 
 Przewalski's horse, E. f. przewalskii  reintroduced
 Onager, E. hemionus 
 Mongolian wild ass, E. h. hemionus 
 Turkmenian kulan, E. h. kulan 
 Kiang, E. kiang 
 Eastern kiang, E. k. holdereri 
 Western kiang, E. k. kiang 
 Southern kiang, E. k. polyodon
Family: Rhinocerotidae (rhinos)
Genus: Dicerorhinus
 Sumatran rhinoceros, D. sumatrensis  extirpated
Genus: Rhinoceros
 Javan rhinoceros, R. sondaicus  extirpated
 Indian rhinoceros, R. unicornis  possibly extirpated

Order: Artiodactyla (even-toed ungulates) 

The even-toed ungulates are ungulates whose weight is borne about equally by the third and fourth toes, rather than mostly or entirely by the third as in perissodactyls. There are about 220 artiodactyl species, including many that are of great economic importance to humans.
Family: Bovidae (cattle, antelope, sheep, goats)
Subfamily: Antilopinae
Genus: Gazella
Goitered gazelle, G. subgutturosa 
Genus: Pantholops
 Tibetan antelope, P. hodgsonii 
Genus: Procapra
 Mongolian gazelle, P. gutturosa 
 Goa, P. picticaudata 
 Przewalski's gazelle, P. przewalskii 
Genus: Saiga
 Saiga antelope, S. tatarica  extirpated
Subfamily: Bovinae
Genus: Bos
Gaur, B. gaurus 
Banteng, B. javanicus  presence uncertain
Wild yak, B. mutus 
Subfamily: Caprinae
Genus: Budorcas
Takin, B. taxicolor 
Genus: Capra
 Siberian ibex, C. sibrica 
Genus: Capricornis
Mainland serow, C. sumatraensis 
Genus: Hemitragus
Himalayan tahr, H. jemlahicus 
Genus: Naemorhedus
Red goral, N. baileyi 
Long-tailed goral, N. caudatus 
Himalayan goral, N. goral 
Chinese goral, N. griseus 
Genus: Ovis
Argali, O. ammon 
Genus: Pseudois
Bharal, P. nayaur 
Family: Camelidae (camels, llamas)
Genus: Camelus
 Wild Bactrian camel, C. ferus 
Family: Cervidae (deer)
Subfamily: Cervinae
Genus: Axis
Indian hog deer, A. porcinus  possibly extirpated
Genus: Cervus
 Thorold's deer, C. albirostris 
 Wapiti, C. canadensis 
 Kansu red deer, C. c. kanzuensis 
 Sichuan deer, C. c. macnelli
 Tibetan red deer, C. c. wallichi
 Manchurian wapiti, C. c. xanthopygus
Red deer, C. elaphus  
Central Asian red deer C. hanglu 
Yarkand deer, C. h. yarkandensis 
 Sika deer, C. nippon 
Genus: Elaphurus
 Père David's deer, E. davidianus 
Genus: Rucervus
Eld's deer, R. eldii 
Genus: Rusa
 Sambar deer, R. unicolor 
Subfamily: Hydropotinae
Genus: Hydropotes
 Water deer, H. inermis 
Subfamily: Muntiacinae
Genus: Elaphodus
 Tufted deer, E. cephalophus 
Genus: Muntiacus
 Hairy-fronted muntjac, M. crinifrons 
 Fea's muntjac, M. feae 
 Gongshan muntjac, M. gongshanensis 
 Indian muntjac, M. muntjak 
 Reeves's muntjac, M. reevesi 
Subfamily: Capreolinae
Genus: Alces
 Moose, A. alces 
Genus: Capreolus
 Siberian roe deer, C. pygargus 
Genus: Rangifer
 Reindeer, R. tarandus 
Family: Moschidae
Genus: Moschus
 Dwarf musk deer, M. berezovskii 
Alpine musk deer, M. chrysogaster 
Black musk deer, M. fuscus 
 Siberian musk deer, M. moschiferus 
Family Suidae
Genus: Sus
 Wild boar, S. scrofa 
Family: Tragulidae
Genus: Tragulus
 Lesser mouse deer, T. kanchil

See also
List of chordate orders
List of mammals of Hong Kong
List of mammals of Macau
List of mammals of Taiwan
Lists of mammals by region
Mammal classification
Wildlife of China

Notes

References
 

Mammals
China
China